
Year 369 (CCCLXIX) was a common year starting on Thursday (link will display the full calendar) of the Julian calendar. At the time, it was known as the Year of the Consulship of Galates and Victor (or, less frequently, year 1122 Ab urbe condita). The denomination 369 for this year has been used since the early medieval period, when the Anno Domini calendar era became the prevalent method in Europe for naming years.

Events 
<onlyinclude>

By place

Roman Empire 
 Spring – Emperor Valens crosses the Danube at Noviodunum (Romania), and attacks the Gothic tribes (Greuthungi and Tervingi). Their king Athanaric is defeated and forced to flee for his life. He sues for peace, concluding a treaty with Valens. The treaty includes free trade and an agreement to provide troops for tribute.
 Fritigern becomes king of the Visigoths; amidst hostilities with his rival Athanaric, he asks Valens and the Thracian field army to intervene. They end the civil war, and Fritigern converts to Christianity.
 Count Theodosius brings Britain fully back to the Empire after the Great Conspiracy of 367.

Persia

 King Shapur II occupies the pro-Roman kingdom of Armenia. He besieges Artogerassa in modern Georgia, where Papas (Pap), son of King Arsaces II (Arshak II), defends the fortress and the royal treasure against Persian forces.

Asia 
 Chinese troops of the Jin Dynasty are defeated by Former Yan of the Xianbei.
 Goguryeo invades Baekje (approximate date).

By topic

Art and Science 
 Wulfila creates a Gothic alphabet composed of letters based on Greek and Roman letters, as well as some Germanic runes. He converts the Goths to Arian Christianity.

Births 
 Huan Xuan, Chinese warlord and emperor of the Jin Dynasty (d. 404)

Deaths 

 May 3 – Juvenal of Narni, Roman Catholic bishop, confessor and saint
 Caesarius of Nazianzus, Byzantine physician and politician (b. 331)
 Pharantzem, Armenian queen and regent (approximate date)
 Valentinus, Roman criminal and rebel leader

References